Konrad Nowak (born 7 November 1994) is a Polish professional footballer who plays as an attacking midfielder for Odra Opole.

Club career

Nowak started his career with Rozwój Katowice.

On 13 August 2020, he joined Odra Opole on a one-year contract.

References

External links
 Konrad Nowak at Footballdatabase
 

1994 births
Sportspeople from Katowice
Living people
Polish footballers
Poland youth international footballers
Association football forwards
Rozwój Katowice players
Górnik Zabrze players
Puszcza Niepołomice players
Odra Opole players
Ekstraklasa players
I liga players
III liga players